Rogelio Bautista Martínez Ulloa (November 5, 1918 – May 24, 2010) was a pitcher in Major League Baseball who played briefly for the Washington Senators during the  season. He was born in Cidra, Matanzas Province, Cuba. Martínez was nicknamed Limonar, after the modest little town in his native Matanzas where he started to play baseball.
In one major league season, Martínez posted a 0–1 record with a 27.00 ERA in two appearances, including one start, giving up four runs on four hits and two walks while striking out none in 1.1 innings of work.

Martínez died at the age of 91 after suffering an internal hemorrhage after a fall.

See also
1950 Washington Senators season
List of Major League Baseball players from Cuba

External links

Retrosheet

 

1918 births
2010 deaths
Accidental deaths from falls
Accidental deaths in Connecticut
Angeles de Puebla players
Havana Cubans players
Major League Baseball pitchers
Major League Baseball players from Cuba
Cuban expatriate baseball players in the United States
Mexican League baseball pitchers
México Azul players
Shelby Clippers players
Sportspeople from New London, Connecticut
Tampa Smokers players
Tigres del México players
Washington Senators (1901–1960) players
Williamsport Grays players
Cuban expatriate baseball players in Mexico
People from Matanzas Province